The 1969 Pacific typhoon season was the fourth least-active season on record. The season had no official bounds; it ran year-round in 1969, but most tropical cyclones tend to form in the northwestern Pacific Ocean between June and December. These dates conventionally delimit the period of each year when most tropical cyclones form in the northwestern Pacific Ocean.

The scope of this article is limited to the Pacific Ocean, north of the equator and west of the International Date Line. Storms that form east of the date line and north of the equator are called hurricanes; see 1969 Pacific hurricane season. Tropical Storms formed in the entire west pacific basin were assigned a name by the Joint Typhoon Warning Center. Tropical depressions in this basin have the "W" suffix added to their number. Tropical depressions that enter or form in the Philippine area of responsibility are assigned a name by the Philippine Atmospheric, Geophysical and Astronomical Services Administration or PAGASA. This can often result in the same storm having two names

Systems 

34 tropical depressions formed this year in the Western Pacific, of which 23 became tropical storms. 13 storms reached typhoon intensity, of which 2 reached super typhoon strength.

Typhoon Phyllis

Tropical Storm Rita

Typhoon Susan (Atring)

Tropical Depression Bining

Typhoon Tess (Kuring)

Typhoon Viola (Elang) 

Large Super Typhoon Viola, which formed on July 22 east of the Philippines, brushed northern Luzon with winds of 150 mph on the 26th. It continued to the northwest, and weakened due to lack of inflow. Viola hit southeastern China as a minimal typhoon on the 28th, and dissipated the next day. The typhoon caused more than 1000 deaths in and around Shantou, Guangdong, China, where it made the landfall.

Tropical Depression Daling

Severe Tropical Storm Winnie (Goring)

Severe Tropical Storm Alice

Typhoon Betty (Huling)

Typhoon Cora (Ibiang)

Typhoon Doris

Tropical Depression 12W

Tropical Depression Luming

Tropical Depression 11W

Tropical Depression 13W (Miling)

Typhoon Elsie (Narsing) 

On September 19, Tropical Depression 14W formed over the open Western Pacific. It tracked almost due westward, becoming a tropical storm on the 20th and a typhoon on the 21st. Elsie continued to intensify, and reached a peak of 175 mph winds on the 24th. After peaking, the typhoon steadily weakened as it moved westward. On the 26th 105 mph Typhoon Elsie hit northern Taiwan, and a day later hit eastern China. After drifting northward, Elsie dissipated over China on September 28. The typhoon killed 102 people, with 24 missing and 227 injured from the system.

Typhoon Flossie (Openg) 

Just days after Elsie hit Taiwan, Tropical Storm Flossie approached Taiwan. From October 1 to the 5th, it drifted northward offshore of the island. It accelerated to the northeast, and became extratropical on the 10th east of Japan. Flossie's heavy rains left 75 people dead.

Typhoon Grace

Tropical Depression 17W

Typhoon Helen

Typhoon Ida

Typhoon June (Pining)

Typhoon Kathy (Rubing)

Severe Tropical Storm Lorna (Saling)

Tropical Storm Marie

Storm names

International 
Western North Pacific tropical cyclones were named by the Joint Typhoon Warning Center. The first storm of 1969 was named Phyllis and the final one was named Marie.

Philippines 

The Philippine Atmospheric, Geophysical and Astronomical Services Administration uses its own naming scheme for tropical cyclones in their area of responsibility. PAGASA assigns names to tropical depressions that form within their area of responsibility and any tropical cyclone that might move into their area of responsibility. Should the list of names for a given year prove to be insufficient, names are taken from an auxiliary list, the first 6 of which are published each year before the season starts. Names not retired from this list will be used again in the 1973 season. This is the same list used for the 1965 season. PAGASA uses its own naming scheme that starts in the Filipino alphabet, with names of Filipino female names ending with "ng" (A, B, K, D, etc.).

Season effects 
This table will list all the storms that developed in the northwestern Pacific Ocean west of the International Date Line and north of the equator during 1969. It will include their intensity, duration, name, areas affected, deaths, missing persons (in parentheses), and damage totals. Classification and intensity values will be based on estimations conducted by the JMA, however due to lack of information around this time sustained winds were recorded by the JTWC. All damage figures will be in 1969 USD. Damages and deaths from a storm will include when the storm was a precursor wave or an extratropical low.

|-
| Phyllis ||  || bgcolor=#| || bgcolor=#| || bgcolor=#| || Micronesia || None || None ||
|-
| TD ||  || bgcolor=#| || bgcolor=#| || bgcolor=#| || Caroline Islands ||  None || None ||
|-
| Rita ||  || bgcolor=#| || bgcolor=#| || bgcolor=#| || Micronesia ||  None || None ||
|-
| Susan (Atring) ||  || bgcolor=#| || bgcolor=#| || bgcolor=#| || Caroline Islands, Philippines || Unknown || Unknown ||
|-
| Bining ||  || bgcolor=#| || bgcolor=#| || bgcolor=#| || Philippines ||  None || None ||
|-
| TD ||  || bgcolor=#| || bgcolor=#| || bgcolor=#| || None ||  None || None ||
|-
| Tess (Kuring) ||  || bgcolor=#| || bgcolor=#| || bgcolor=#| || Philippines, Vietnam || Unknown || Unknown ||
|-
| TD ||  || bgcolor=#| || bgcolor=#| || bgcolor=#| || Caroline Islands, Philippines ||  None || None ||
|-
| TD ||  || bgcolor=#| || bgcolor=#| || bgcolor=#| || None ||  None || None ||
|-
| TD ||  || bgcolor=#| || bgcolor=#| || bgcolor=#| || None ||  None || None ||
|-
| TD ||  || bgcolor=#| || bgcolor=#| || bgcolor=#| || Philippines, Vietnam ||  None || None ||
|-
| TD ||  || bgcolor=#| || bgcolor=#| || bgcolor=#| || Vietnam ||  None || None ||
|-
| TD ||  || bgcolor=#| || bgcolor=#| || bgcolor=#| || None ||  None || None ||
|-
| Viola (Elang) ||  || bgcolor=#| || bgcolor=#| || bgcolor=#| || Philippines, Taiwan, China || Unknown || > ||
|-
| Daling ||  || bgcolor=#| || bgcolor=#| || bgcolor=#| || South China ||  None || None ||
|-
| Winnie (Goring) ||  || bgcolor=#| || bgcolor=#| || bgcolor=#| || None || None || None ||
|-
| TD ||  || bgcolor=#| || bgcolor=#| || bgcolor=#| || Caroline Islands ||  None || None ||
|-
| TD ||  || bgcolor=#| || bgcolor=#| || bgcolor=#| || None ||  None || None ||
|-
| Alice ||  || bgcolor=#| || bgcolor=#| || bgcolor=#| || Japan || None || None ||
|-
| TD ||  || bgcolor=#| || bgcolor=#| || bgcolor=#| || None ||  None || None ||
|-
| Betty (Huling) ||  || bgcolor=#| || bgcolor=#| || bgcolor=#| || Taiwan, Ryukyu Islands, East China || Unknown || Unknown ||
|-
| TD ||  || bgcolor=#| || bgcolor=#| || bgcolor=#| || Taiwan ||  None || None ||
|-
| Cora (Ibiang) ||  || bgcolor=#| || bgcolor=#| || bgcolor=#| || Caroline Islands, Ryukyu Islands, Japan || Unknown || Unknown ||
|-
| Doris ||  || bgcolor=#| || bgcolor=#| || bgcolor=#| || Vietnam, Laos || Unknown || Unknown ||
|-
| TD ||  || bgcolor=#| || bgcolor=#| || bgcolor=#| || Caroline Islands ||  None || None ||
|-
| TD ||  || bgcolor=#| || bgcolor=#| || bgcolor=#| || None ||  None || None ||
|-
| TD ||  || bgcolor=#| || bgcolor=#| || bgcolor=#| || Palau ||  None || None ||
|-
| Luming ||  || bgcolor=#| || bgcolor=#| || bgcolor=#| || Philippines ||  None || None ||
|-
| 12W ||  || bgcolor=#| || bgcolor=#| || bgcolor=#| || Philippines ||  None || None ||
|-
| TD ||  || bgcolor=#| || bgcolor=#| || bgcolor=#| || Ryukyu Islands ||  None || None ||
|-
| 11W ||  || bgcolor=#| || bgcolor=#| || bgcolor=#| || Philippines, Taiwan ||  None || None ||
|-
| 13W (Miling) ||  || bgcolor=#| || bgcolor=#| || bgcolor=#| || Philippines, Taiwan ||  None || None ||
|-
| TD ||  || bgcolor=#| || bgcolor=#| || bgcolor=#| || None ||  None || None ||
|-
| Elsie (Narsing) ||  || bgcolor=#| || bgcolor=#| || bgcolor=#| || Mariana Islands, Taiwan, Ryukyu Islands, China || Unknown ||  ||
|-
| TD ||  || bgcolor=#| || bgcolor=#| || bgcolor=#| || Vietnam ||  None || None ||
|-
| TD ||  || bgcolor=#| || bgcolor=#| || bgcolor=#| || None ||  None || None ||
|-
| TD ||  || bgcolor=#| || bgcolor=#| || bgcolor=#| || None ||  None || None ||
|-
| TD ||  || bgcolor=#| || bgcolor=#| || bgcolor=#| || None ||  None || None ||
|-
| Flossie (Openg) ||  || bgcolor=#| || bgcolor=#| || bgcolor=#| || Taiwan, Ryukyu Islands || Unknown ||  ||
|-
| Grace ||  || bgcolor=#| || bgcolor=#| || bgcolor=#| || None || None || None ||
|-
| 17W ||  || bgcolor=#| || bgcolor=#| || bgcolor=#| || Philippines ||  None || None ||
|-
| TD ||  || bgcolor=#| || bgcolor=#| || bgcolor=#| || None ||  None || None ||
|-
| TD ||  || bgcolor=#| || bgcolor=#| || bgcolor=#| || None ||  None || None ||
|-
| TD ||  || bgcolor=#| || bgcolor=#| || bgcolor=#| || Mariana Islands ||  None || None ||
|-
| Helen ||  || bgcolor=#| || bgcolor=#| || bgcolor=#| || Mariana Islands || None || None ||
|-
| TD ||  || bgcolor=#| || bgcolor=#| || bgcolor=#| || None ||  None || None ||
|-
| Ida ||  || bgcolor=#| || bgcolor=#| || bgcolor=#| || Mariana Islands || None || None ||
|-
| TD ||  || bgcolor=#| || bgcolor=#| || bgcolor=#| || None ||  None || None ||
|-
| TD ||  || bgcolor=#| || bgcolor=#| || bgcolor=#| || Caroline Islands ||  None || None ||
|-
| June (Pining) ||  || bgcolor=#| || bgcolor=#| || bgcolor=#| || None || None || None ||
|-
| TD ||  || bgcolor=#| || bgcolor=#| || bgcolor=#| || Philippines ||  None || None ||
|-
| Kathy (Rubing) ||  || bgcolor=#| || bgcolor=#| || bgcolor=#| || Caroline Islands || None || None ||
|-
| TD ||  || bgcolor=#| || bgcolor=#| || bgcolor=#| || Caroline Islands ||  None || None ||
|-
| TD ||  || bgcolor=#| || bgcolor=#| || bgcolor=#| || Philippines ||  None || None ||
|-
| TD ||  || bgcolor=#| || bgcolor=#| || bgcolor=#| || None ||  None || None ||
|-
| Lorna (Saling) ||  || bgcolor=#| || bgcolor=#| || bgcolor=#| || Philippines || None || None ||
|-
| TD ||  || bgcolor=#| || bgcolor=#| || bgcolor=#| || None ||  None || None ||
|-
| TD ||  || bgcolor=#| || bgcolor=#| || bgcolor=#| || None ||  None || None ||
|-
| Marie ||  || bgcolor=#| || bgcolor=#| || bgcolor=#| || Mariana Islands ||  None || None ||
|-
| TD ||  || bgcolor=#| || bgcolor=#| || bgcolor=#| || None ||  None || None ||
|-
| TD ||  || bgcolor=#| || bgcolor=#| || bgcolor=#| || Palau ||  None || None ||
|-

See also 

 List of Pacific typhoon seasons
 1969 Pacific hurricane season
 1969 Atlantic hurricane season
 1969 North Indian Ocean cyclone season
 Australian cyclone seasons: 1968–69, 1969–70
 South Pacific cyclone seasons: 1968–69, 1969–70
 South-West Indian Ocean cyclone seasons: 1968–69, 1969–70

References

External links 
 Japan Meteorological Agency
 Joint Typhoon Warning Center .
 China Meteorological Agency
 National Weather Service Guam
 Hong Kong Observatory
 Macau Meteorological Geophysical Services
 Korea Meteorological Agency
 Philippine Atmospheric, Geophysical and Astronomical Services Administration
 Taiwan Central Weather Bureau
 Digital Typhoon - Typhoon Images and Information
 Typhoon2000 Philippine typhoon website